"Por Amar Se Da Todo" ("For Love Gives Everything") is a song written by Salako and performed by Puerto Rican singer Danny Rivera on his studio album Danny (also released as the same title of the song) in 1983. The song was later covered by American salsa singer Marc Anthony on his third studio Todo a Su Tiempo. Marc Anthony's version became his seventh #1 song on the Billboard Tropical Airplay chart. "Por Amar Se Da Todo" was recognized at the 1998 BMI Latin Awards as one of the best performing songs of the year.

See also
List of Billboard Tropical Airplay number ones of 1996

References

1983 songs
1996 singles
Marc Anthony songs
RMM Records singles
Spanish-language songs
Song recordings produced by Sergio George